Oliver Hüsing (born 17 February 1993) is a German professional footballer who plays as a centre-back for  club Arminia Bielefeld.

Club career

Werder Bremen
After almost ten year in the club's youth ranks, on 1 April 2014, Hüsing signed a professional contract with Bundesliga club Werder Bremen until 2017. During the following Bundesliga season, he managed to earn a spot for the first team's squad in four Bundesliga matches, coming in from the bench even twice. In January 2015, he was loaned to 3. Liga side Hansa Rostock for the remainder of the season.

Ferencváros
After twelve years with Werder Bremen, Hüsing signed for Ferencváros in June 2016. The reported transfer fee was €300,000.

Hansa Rostock
In July 2017, Hüsing returned to Hansa Rostock on a free transfer.

Arminia Bielefeld
On 10 June 2022, Hüsing signed with Arminia Bielefeld.

Career statistics

External links

References

1993 births
Living people
German footballers
Association football defenders
3. Liga players
Bundesliga players
2. Bundesliga players
SV Werder Bremen II players
SV Werder Bremen players
FC Hansa Rostock players
Ferencvárosi TC footballers
1. FC Heidenheim players
Arminia Bielefeld players
Nemzeti Bajnokság I players
German expatriate footballers
German expatriate sportspeople in Hungary
Expatriate footballers in Hungary